Atlético Esquivias was a Spanish football team  based in Esquivias, in Toledo (province) in the autonomous community of Castile-La Mancha. Founded in 2006, its plays in Tercera División - Group 18. The stadium is Estadio La Bombonera with capacity of 500 seats.

At beginning to 2008–09 season, the club was dissolved due to its financial problems.

Seasons

1 seasons in Tercera División

Famous players
 Jesús Enrique Velasco

Notable former managers
 Fernando Zambrano

External links
 Atlético Esquivias CF on Futbolme.com

Association football clubs established in 2006
Defunct football clubs in Castilla–La Mancha
Association football clubs disestablished in 2008
2006 establishments in Spain
2008 disestablishments in Spain
Province of Toledo